The Humane Society of Indianapolis (which now goes by IndyHumane) is a humane organization in Indianapolis, Indiana. Located in Marion County, Indiana, it is a private non-profit charitable organization with approximately 10,000 animals cared for each year  and was founded in 1905. In 1919, the Humane Society of Indianapolis merged with the Citizen's Humane Society.
  
It is an animal rescue and adoption operation, whose physical plant is situated at 7929 Michigan Road in the city of Indianapolis. The mission of the Humane Society of Indianapolis is to Provide shelter and comfort to animals in need on the path to loving lifetime homes.

Services

Principal services offered are animal rescue, veterinary care of sick and injured animals who are in their care, adoption services, spay and neuter services for animals subject to intake, microchipping and animal training.  A full-time staff is employed. In house veterinary care is available for intake animals who are injured or infirm. Foster care is available for intake animals who need rehabilitation. To supplement the full-time staff of 37, IndyHumane has several hundred part-time volunteers.

IndyHumane has an on site adoption center and conducts classes in animal behavior.

History and governance

IndyHumane is governed by a 22-member board of directors and has existed for 104 years.

In March 2008, the Humane Society of Indianapolis partnered with Indianapolis Animal Care and Control to improve intake procedures and coordinate services.

In September 2008, John Aleshire began his tenure as executive director, replacing outgoing executive director Martha Boden, who left the position in June 2008.

In May 2017, John Aleshire retired from his CEO position after years of success. Steven Stolen was selected to step into the role of CEO after a nationwide search.

From late 2017 into 2018, the organization transitioned from "Humane Society of Indianapolis" to the shortened, colloquial name "IndyHumane." This rebrand included a new logo.

Fundraising events
The Humane Society of Indianapolis hosts the Mutt Strut annually at the Indianapolis Motor Speedway. 2004 was the inaugural year.

The Humane Society was a beneficiary of the Indyprov Laff-a-thon in 2009.

References

Further reading
"Fighting Like Cats and Dogs" article in Indianapolis Monthly October, 2002

External links

Mutt Strut Official Website

Animal shelters in the United States
Animal charities based in the United States
1905 establishments in Indiana
Charities based in Indiana
Non-profit organizations based in Indianapolis